Roseovarius confluentis is a Gram-negative and strictly aerobic bacterium from the genus of Roseovarius which has been isolated from estuary sediments from Korea.

References

External links
Type strain of Roseovarius confluentis at BacDive -  the Bacterial Diversity Metadatabase

Rhodobacteraceae
Bacteria described in 2017